Alfredo Jorge Nobre da Costa,  (10 September 1923 – 1 April 1996), commonly known as Nobre da Costa, was a Portuguese engineer and politician who briefly served as prime minister of Portugal from August to November 1978.

A moderate independent center-left politician, he was appointed by President António Ramalho Eanes to serve as prime minister that would finish the four-year legislative term which had been initiated in the 1976 Portuguese legislative election. His cabinet consisted of independents. However, it failed to gain a majority in the Assembly of the Republic, and Nobre da Costa resigned. He was replaced by Carlos Alberto da Mota Pinto.

Early life 
He was the only son of Alfredo Henrique Andresen da Costa (born 4 November 1893), who was Portuguese of Italian, French, Danish and Goan ancestry, and Maria Helena Nobre.

He graduated from Instituto Superior Técnico.

Personal life 
He married Maria de Lourdes de Carvalho e Cunha Fortes da Gama on 5 May 1951 and had a single daughter, Vera Maria Nobre da Costa (born 5 February 1952). He died in 1996 after a long illness. At the time of his death he held the position of chairman at the engineering firm EFACEC.

Honours
 Commander of the Order of Christ, Portugal (15 September 1961)
 Grand-Cross of the Order of Christ, Portugal (9 April 1981)
Grand-Cross of the Order of Merit of the Italian Republic, Italy (11 April 1985)

References

1923 births
1996 deaths
People from Lisbon
Prime Ministers of Portugal
Portuguese people of Goan descent
Portuguese politicians of Indian descent
Portuguese people of Italian descent
Government ministers of Portugal
20th-century Portuguese engineers
Technical University of Lisbon alumni
Instituto Superior Técnico alumni